Hinton on the Green is a village and civil parish in the Wychavon district of Worcestershire in England. It is situated at the foot of Bredon Hill, about two miles south of Evesham.

Description 
At a little over three square miles, the land is largely agricultural. Most of the 101 houses and 254 residents (as of 2001) are grouped in a small area between the church and the site of the former railway station.  The River Isbourne valley divides Hinton into the "East Village", near to the church, and the "West Village".
 
Most of the houses in the East Village date from the 19th century; many of the properties to the West of the Isbourne are much newer.  Most of the farmland, and many of the properties in the East Village, are leased from a Laslett's charity, a trust set up in 1879 by William Laslett, a Worcestershire lawyer, landowner and MP. The charity supports Church of England churches and makes grants to community welfare organisations.
 
The building that formerly housed a village school has been converted into houses. The single shop in the village is specialised in the sale of agricultural machinery.
 
The main A46 from Evesham to Cheltenham passes through the parish and is crossed by the Broadway to Pershore Road (formerly The London Road) at Hinton Cross, but the majority of the houses are located on a quiet loop.

The Isbourne is three or four metres wide and less than a metre deep, and occasionally floods. The most notable recent flood was in July 2007 when the small river became a torrent about a hundred metres wide and five metres deep. Two houses built on the river bank suffered serious damage, but the rest of the village is well above the flood plain and avoided the devastation that hit nearby Sedgeberrow just a mile upstream.

Church 
The Church of England parish church of St Peter is Grade II* listed.

Railways
The former railway station, known simply as Hinton, belonged to the Midland Railway (later part of the LMS), and was on a lengthy loop line, the Gloucester Loop Line, branching off the Birmingham and Gloucester Railway main line at Ashchurch, passing through Evesham station, Alcester and Redditch, and rejoining the main line at Barnt Green, near Bromsgrove. The loop was built to address the fact that the main line bypassed most of the towns it might otherwise have served, but it took three separate companies to complete.

The loop officially closed between Ashchurch and Redditch in June 1963, but poor condition of the track had brought about withdrawal of all trains between Evesham and Redditch earlier, in October 1962, being replaced by a bus service for the final eight months. Redditch to Barnt Green remains open on the electrified Birmingham suburban network. Hinton station house still stands.

References

External links

 Hinton on the Green – Gloucestershire Victoria County History, 1968
 River Isbourne flood warnings
 Bellringing at St.Peter's
 Pictures at geograph.org.uk
 Worcester Branch of the Birmingham and Midland Society for Genealogy and Heraldry

Villages in Worcestershire
Civil parishes in Worcestershire
Wychavon